General Ronald Ellis Keys (born February 3, 1945) is a retired United States Air Force officer who served as Commander, Air Combat Command, with headquarters in Langley Air Force Base, Virginia, and Air Component Commander for United States Joint Forces Command and United States Northern Command.

Military career
Keys was responsible for organizing, training, equipping and maintaining combat-ready forces for rapid deployment and employment, while ensuring strategic air defense forces are ready to meet the challenges of peacetime air sovereignty and wartime defense.  At the time, ACC operated more than 1,100 aircraft, 25 wings, 15 bases and more than 200 operating locations worldwide with 105,000 active-duty and civilian personnel. When mobilized, the Air National Guard and Air Force Reserve contributed more than 800 aircraft and 75,000 people to Air Combat Command.

As the Combat Air Forces lead agent, ACC develops strategy, doctrine, concepts, tactics and procedures for air and space power employment. The command provides conventional, nuclear and information warfare forces to all unified commands to ensure air, space and information superiority for warfighters and national decision-makers. ACC can also be called upon to assist national agencies with intelligence, surveillance and crisis response capabilities.

Keys, a distinguished graduate of Kansas State University's ROTC program, was commissioned in 1967 and was an outstanding graduate of undergraduate pilot training. He has commanded a fighter squadron, the United States Air Force Fighter Weapons School, an F-15 wing, an A/OA-10 and F-16 wing, the Combat Air Forces Operational Test and Evaluation Wing, a numbered air force, and Allied Air Forces Southern Europe.

Additionally, Keys was the first commander of the Air Force Doctrine Center, and he has served as an executive assistant to the Air Force Chief of Staff and to an Assistant Secretary of Defense. Prior to his current assignment, he was Deputy Chief of Staff for Air and Space Operations, Headquarters U.S. Air Force, Washington, D.C.

In 2002, Keys was Chairman of the Joint Chiefs of Staff Richard B. Myers' choice to succeed Lieutenant General Gregory S. Newbold as director of operations (J-3) for the Joint Staff. By long-standing tradition, the chairman of the Joint Chiefs had been allowed to select his own top subordinates, but Defense Secretary Donald H. Rumsfeld adopted a sharply different practice of personally interviewing all candidates for three- and four-star rank. Rumsfeld vetoed Keys' appointment after two interviews, forcing Myers to select Lieutenant General Norton A. Schwartz instead. The failure of Keys' nomination was subsequently recounted by senior military officers as an illustration of strained civilian-military relations at the Pentagon under Rumsfeld's leadership.

Keys is a command pilot with more than 4,000 flying hours, including more than 300 hours of combat time in Southeast Asia.

General Keys retired November 1, 2007.

Education
1967 Bachelor's degree in entomology, Kansas State University, Manhattan
1971 Squadron Officer School
1974 Air Command and Staff College
1978 Master's degree in business administration, Golden Gate University, San Francisco, Calif.
1988 Air War College, Maxwell AFB, Ala.

Flight information
Rating: Command pilot
Flight hours: More than 4,000
Aircraft flown: A-10, F-4, F-15 Eagle and F-16 Fighting Falcon

Awards and decorations

References

1945 births
Living people
United States Air Force generals
United States Air Force personnel of the Vietnam War
Recipients of the Legion of Merit
Recipients of the Distinguished Flying Cross (United States)
Recipients of the Air Medal
Recipients of the Gallantry Cross (Vietnam)
Recipients of the Defense Superior Service Medal
Recipients of the Defense Distinguished Service Medal
Recipients of the Navy Distinguished Service Medal
Air War College alumni